Singapore International School (SIS) is a kindergarten, elementary and secondary (up to Form Four and International Baccalaureate Diploma First Year and second year) school situated in two different campuses on Nam Long Shan Road, Hong Kong Island.

It is an international school set up by the Ministry of Education of Singapore and follows the Singaporean curriculum. The school was established in September 1991 in Kennedy Town with an enrollment of 200 students. This number has risen above the 1500 students mark, from a variety of nationalities, with the majority being Hong Kongers and Singaporeans.

History

By 1994 it became popular with international families wishing to expose their children to Chinese languages in their education.

Location
In 1995, it moved to its current premises on Nam Long Shan road near Aberdeen, occupying an area of 4,150 square meters. The land was granted by the Hong Kong Government while the cost of the building was borne by the Singapore government.

SIS’s secondary school section has used the premises of the former Wanchai School as its temporary premises from the 2009/2010 academic year to June 2011 and the P5 in 2009/2010 were the first Secondary 1 students there. The temporary Wanchai premises have the basic features of a secondary school, such as an IGCSE-certified Science laboratory, an air-conditioned auditorium, two art studios, two music studios, one dance studio and a fitness room. The pupils used the Morrison Hill swimming pool, Queen Elizabeth Stadium and Happy Valley Recreation Ground, all within 10 minutes of walking time.

The school moved back to their new secondary school campus at Police School Road in the academic year 2011/2012, when the first pre-university cohort commenced their IB Diploma Programme studies.

Curriculum
In 1994, Mandarin courses were offered twice daily per school schedule at the primary school level.

Other information
SIS celebrated its 15th anniversary on 28 April 2006, with an original musical performance entitled "Reaching out, Touching Lives" involving every pupil in the school.  It was performed at the Grand Theatre of the Hong Kong Cultural Centre. The school also celebrated its 25th anniversary in 2016, with a new piece of artwork inspired by Joan Miró called Ties That Bind.

References

External links
Singapore International School Official website

International schools in Hong Kong
Nam Long Shan
Educational institutions established in 1991
Primary schools in Hong Kong
Singaporean international schools in China
International Baccalaureate schools in Hong Kong
1991 establishments in Hong Kong